The United People's Party was a political party in Saint Kitts and Nevis. The party first contested national elections in 1993, when they received 3.1% of the vote and failed to win any seats. In the 1995 elections they received just 71 votes and again failed to win a seat. The party did not contest any further elections.

References

Political parties in Saint Kitts and Nevis
1990s in Saint Kitts and Nevis